A gardener is a person involved in gardening.

Gardener may also refer to:

Gardener (surname)
Gardener (comics), Marvel Comics character
The Gardener (disambiguation)
Gardener 1NT, contract bridge convention

See also
Gardner (disambiguation)
Gardiner (disambiguation)